Rhabdophyllia is an extinct genus of stony corals.

Fossil records

This genus is known in the fossil record from the Jurassic to the Miocene (from about 189.6 to 15.9 million years ago). Fossils of species within this genus have been found in Indonesia, Iran, Europe, Pakistan, Japan and Morocco.

Species
Species within this genus include:
 †Rhabdophyllia budense Kolosvary 1949
 †Rhabdophyllia flexuosa Roniewicz 1976
 †Rhabdophyllia indica Duncan 1880
 †Rhabdophyllia nariensis Duncan 1880
 †Rhabdophyllia oshimaensis Eguchi 1951
 †Rhabdophyllia phaceloida Beauvais 1986
 †Rhabdophyllia recondita Laube 1865
 †Rhabdophyllia retiformans Kühn 1933
 †Rhabdophyllia schmidti Koby 1895

References

Prehistoric Hexacorallia genera
Scleractinia
Pliensbachian first appearances
Burdigalian extinctions
Taxa named by Henri Milne-Edwards
Taxa named by Jules Haime